This is a list of ghost towns in the Canadian province of British Columbia, including those still partly inhabited or even overtaken by modern towns, as well as those completely abandoned or derelict.  Region of location and associated events or enterprises are included.

See also
Fisherman, British Columbia
List of mines in British Columbia
Paulson, British Columbia
Teepee, British Columbia

References

Bruce Ramsey, Ghost Towns of British Columbia, Mitchell Press, Vancouver, 1963, OCLC: 39371
T W Paterson, Encyclopedia of ghost towns & mining camps of British Columbia, Stagecoach Pub., Langley, 1979, ISBN

British Columbia
Ghost towns